The Western Institute in Poznań (Polish: Instytut Zachodni, German West-Institut, French: L'Institut Occidental) is a scientific research society focusing on the Western provinces of Poland - Kresy Zachodnie (including Greater Poland, Silesia, Pomerania), history, economy and politics of Germany, and the Polish-German relations in history and today.

Established by professor Zygmunt Wojciechowski in 1944 in Warsaw, since 1945 based in Poznań. There were branches in Warsaw (1945–53), Wrocław (1948–49) and scientific posts in Kraków and Olsztyn.

Full name: Instytut Zachodni. Instytut Naukowo-Badawczy im. Zygmunta Wojciechowskiego w Poznaniu

History
The Western Institute was founded in 1944 and became the flagship of the Polish Research of the West.

Mission

The mission of the Institute is to conduct research projects within fields of political science, sociology, history, economics and law-especially focusing on Polish-German issues as well as European politics. It has been founded by a group of Poznań University professor in 1944, and incorporated with Polish Ministry of Foreign Affairs in 1992

Praise
Professor Władysław Bartoszewski, Polish survivor of Auschwitz, and renown figure of Polish-Jewish and Polish-German reconciliation praised the work of the institute:
I often used the archives of the Western Institute, when writing my works on the Nazi terror. They reliably researched Nazi atrocities. The series "Documenta Occupationis"-a collection of original documents concerning German policy in occupied Poland is a canon position. Many American, Israeli and German scholars use them to this day without reservations. They are part of scholarly literature and this is the greatest contribution of the Institute during its early years of existence

Criticism

The work of the Institute carried out while Poland was a communist country has been criticised by German-American historian Richard Blanke as having anti-German bias
Other criticism of work from this period have included allegations of propaganda and dullness while admitting that the Institute produced "some good works on political sciences and legal systems"

German historian Gregor Thum has written that the premise of the research concept of the Western Institute in the first decades was the idea of an eternal German-Polish antagonism and thus the Institute's research, like its German counterpart, the Ostforschung, was based on explicit political objectives, active support of the territorial claims of the state and the distribution of research results by popular science.

After the fall of communism, the Institute has been one of the leading institutions in joint Polish-German scholarship and cooperation.

The directors 
 1945-1955 - prof. Zygmunt Wojciechowski
 1956-1958 - prof. Kazimierz Piwarski
 1959-1961 - prof. Gerard Labuda
 1961-1964 - prof. Michał Sczaniecki
 1964-1965 - prof. Zdzisław Kaczmarczyk
 1966-1973 - prof. Władysław Markiewicz
 1974-1978 - prof. Lech Trzeciakowski
 1978-1990 - prof. Antoni Czubiński
 1990-2004 - prof. Anna Wolff-Powęska
 since 2004 - prof. Andrzej Sakson

Main publications 
 The Western Review (Przegląd Zachodni)
 Polish Western Affairs
 La Pologne et les Affaires Occidentales

See also 
 Government Delegate's Office at Home

References

External links 
http://www.iz.poznan.pl/ Instytut Zachodni official site (in English and Polish)

Organisations based in Poznań
Scientific societies based in Poland